Erwinia psidii is a Gram-negative bacterium and a phytopathogen of the common guava (Psidium guajava), causing rot in branches, flowers and fruits. Recently, it was demonstrated that this species produces two acyl homoserine lactones (S-(-)-N-hexanoyl- and N-heptanoyl-homoserine lactone), widely recognized bacterial quorum sensing signaling substances, and employed in bacterial cell-to-cell communication systems.

References

External links
 Type strain of Erwinia psidii at BacDive -  the Bacterial Diversity Metadatabase

Bacterial plant pathogens and diseases
Bacteria described in 1988
Enterobacterales